The Churchill Downs Stakes is a Grade I American Thoroughbred horse race for four-year-old and older sprinters run over a distance of seven furlongs on the dirt annually in early May at Churchill Downs racetrack in Louisville, Kentucky as an undercard event on Kentucky Derby day. The event currently offers a purse of $750,000.

History

The inaugural running of the event was as the Churchill Downs Handicap took place on closing day of the Churchill Downs Spring meeting, June 6, 1911, as a three-year-old and over race over a distance of  miles with five starters and was won by Carlton G. in track record time of 1:51 under jockey George Taplin for owner and trainer Lon Johnson. The following year longshot Any Port equalled the record 1:51 winning by  lengths. The event was held once more at the  miles distance in 1913 before the track would have the race mothballed until 1938.

In 1938 the event was reinstated at a distance of seven furlongs but was extended to one mile for the 1940 running. Louise Hickman's Arab's Arrow would win the event three years straight including a dead heat victory with Kings Blue in 1939. In 1947 the event was held on opening day of the spring meeting at a shortened distance of seven furlongs. In 1949 the event only attracted four starters of which two were a Calumet Farm entry of Free America and the 1947 American Horse of the Year Armed thus enabling Churchill Downs to hold the event as a non betting Exhibition Race.

The 1951 before a crowd of 18,000 on opening day of the spring meeting the winner of the event was the Detroit based sprinter Johns Joy who broke the seven furlongs time record in 1:22 which was held by Distinction and stood since 1921.

The distance of the event was decreased to six furlongs for four running held from 1952 to 1955. Soon after return to the now distance of seven furlongs, in 1958 Shac Pan set a new track record of 1:22 flat winning by a head over Ezgo.
 
The event was held in split divisions twice - 1982 and 1985. In 1983 the conditions of the event were modified from handicap to stakes allowance for four-year-olds and older which reflect in the name of the event.

Since 1986 the event has been scheduled on the same day as the Kentucky Derby. In 1988 the event reverted to a handicap and was held with such conditions until 2006.

In 1992 the event was classified as Grade III. The winner that year, 4/5 odds-on Pleasant Tap would also win the Grade I Jockey Club Gold Cup and the Suburban Handicap and was awarded the U.S. Champion Older Male Horse.

The event was upgraded to Grade II in 1998. That year the winner 7/5 favorite Distorted Humor set a new track of 1:21.18 winning by  lengths over Gold Land. The track record was once again broken in this event in 2001 when Alannan won in a time of 1:20.50. That day on Kentucky Derby Day, three track records were broken.

The 2004 winner six-year-old Speightstown continued his brilliant year capturing the Breeders' Cup Sprint and being crowned the U.S. Champion Sprinter.

In 2007 the conditions of the event were changed from handicap to stakes allowance and the name of the event was modified to the Churchill Downs Stakes.

The American Graded Stakes Committee upgraded the race to its current Grade I status in 2019. Mitole, the 2019 winner would also win the Grade I Metropolitan Handicap, Forego Stakes and Breeders' Cup Sprint and was crowned the U.S. Champion Sprinter.

Records
Speed record:
7 furlongs –  1:20.50 Alannan (2001)
6 furlongs –  1:10.60 Roaming (1953)
1 mile – 1:36.60 My Bill (1941)

Margins:
 5 lengths – Barbizon Streak (1974), Dreadnought (1981)

Most wins:
 3 – Arab's Arrow (1938, 1939, 1940)

Most wins by a jockey:
 5 – Steve Brooks (1947, 1949, 1950, 1952, 1959)

Most wins by a trainer:
 3 – Gilbert Hardy (1938, 1939, 1940)
 3 – William I. Mott (1983, 1985, 1999)

Most wins by an owner:
 3 – Louise Hickman (1938, 1939, 1940)
 3 – Dixiana Farm (1950, 1952, 1973)
 3 –  Albert M. Stall Sr.  (1980, 1982, 1985)

Winners

Notes:

§ Ran as an entry

ƒ Filly or Mare

† In the 2002 running of the event Snow Ridge was first past the post but was disqualified due the rider Mike E. Smith accidentally striking D'wildcat's face with his whip as the runners approached the finishing post. D'wildcat was declared the winner.

See also
 List of American and Canadian Graded races

External links
 Churchill Downs Media Guide - $500,000 Churchill Downs

References

Graded stakes races in the United States
Open mile category horse races
Churchill Downs horse races
1911 establishments in Kentucky
Recurring sporting events established in 1911
Grade 1 stakes races in the United States
Horse races in Kentucky